Seyed Ali Mousavi may refer to the following people:

Ali Mousavi - Iranian football (soccer) player
Seyed Ali Mousavi - the nephew of Iranian politician Mir-Hossein Mousavi, whose death sparked protests across Iran